The 500 meters distance for women in the 2015–16 ISU Speed Skating World Cup will be contested over 12 races on six occasions, out of a total of World Cup occasions for the season, with the first occasion taking place in Calgary, Alberta, Canada, on 13–15 November 2015, and the final occasion taking place in Heerenveen, Netherlands, on 11–13 March 2016.

The defending champion is Nao Kodaira of Japan.

Top three

Race medallists

Standings 
Standings as of 30 January 2016.

References 

 
Women 0500